Ernesto Contreras may refer to:

Ernesto Contreras (physician) (1915–2003), Mexican doctor
Ernesto Contreras (cyclist) (1937–2020), Argentinian Olympic cyclist
Ernesto Contreras (director) (born 1969), Mexican film director and screenwriter